Thomas Belsham (26 April 175011 November 1829) was an English Unitarian minister

Life 
Belsham was born in Bedford, England, and was the elder brother of William Belsham, the English political writer and historian. He was educated at the dissenting academy at Daventry, where for seven years he acted as assistant tutor. After three years spent in a charge at Worcester, he returned as head of Daventry Academy, a post which he continued to hold till 1789, when, having adopted Unitarian principles, he resigned. With Joseph Priestley for colleague, he superintended during its brief existence the New College at Hackney, and was, on Priestley's departure in 1794, also called to the charge of the Gravel Pit congregation. In 1805, he accepted a call to the Essex Street Chapel, which was also headquarters and offices of the Unitarian Church under John Disney, there succeeding as minister Theophilus Lindsey who had retired and died three years later in 1808.

Belsham remained at Essex Street, in gradually failing health, until his death in Hampstead, on 11 November 1829. He was buried in Bunhill Fields burial ground, in the same tomb as Theophilus Lindsey. His joint executors were Thomas Field Gibson and his father.

Beliefs 
Belsham's beliefs reflect that transition that the Unitarian movement  was going through during his lifetime, particularly from the early Bible-fundamentalist views of earlier English Unitarians like Henry Hedworth (who introduced the word "Unitarian" into print in English from Dutch sources in 1673) and John Biddle, to the more Bible-critical positions of Priestley's generation. Belsham adopted critical ideas on the Pentateuch by 1807, the Gospels by 1819, and Genesis by 1821. Later, following Priestley, Belsham was to dismiss the virgin birth as "no more entitled to credit, than the fables of the Koran, or the reveries of Swedenborg." (1806)

Works 
Belsham's first work of importance, Review of Mr Wilberforces Treatise entitled Practical View (1798), was written after his conversion to Unitarianism. His most popular work was the Evidences of Christianity; the most important was his translation and exposition of the Epistles of St Paul (1822). He was also the author of a work on philosophy, Elements of the Philosophy of the Human Mind (1801), which is entirely based on Hartley's psychology.

In 1812 Belsham published the Memoirs of the Late Reverend Theophilus Lindsey, M.A., his predecessor at Essex Street. This included a chapter titled "American Unitarianism" arguing that many American clergy entertained Unitarian views.  The Calvinist minister Jedidiah Morse published the chapter separately, as part of his campaign against New England's liberal ministers—contributing to "the Unitarian Controversy" (1815) that eventually produced permanent schism among New England's Congregationalist churches.

His main Christological work was A Calm Inquiry into the Scripture Doctrine concerning the Person of Christ (1817).

Belsham was one of the most vigorous and able writers of his church, and the Quarterly Review and Gentlemans Magazine of the early years of the 19th century abound in evidences that his abilities were recognized by his opponents.

[Thomas Belsham et al.,] The New Testament, An improved version upon the basis of Archbishop Newcome's new translation with a corrected text and notes critical and explanatory. London: Richard Taylor & Co., 1808. Boston 1809.

Notes

References

Attribution

1750 births
1829 deaths
English Unitarian ministers
Dissenting academy tutors
Burials at Bunhill Fields